Patsy is an unincorporated community in Crawford County, in the U.S. state of Missouri. The community is located on Missouri Route BB, along a ridge southeast of Elayer.

History
A post office called Patsy was established in 1894, and remained in operation until 1927. The community was named after Patsy Whalen, a mining official.

References

Unincorporated communities in Crawford County, Missouri
Unincorporated communities in Missouri